Ontronik "Andy" Khachaturian (born 1975) is an American musician, producer and DJ of Armenian descent. He is known for being the original drummer (1994–1997) of the metal band System of a Down and founder/lead vocalist (1999–2002) of the alt-progressive rock band The Apex Theory, as well as the member of his band VoKee. He was also the founder/drummer/keyboardist and backing vocalist of KillMatriarch (2010–2012) and currently is working on his solo project, OnTronik.

History

System of a Down 
Khachaturian was born to Armenian parents in Los Angeles, California. He met Daron Malakian and Shavo Odadjian in high school. He then met Serj Tankian when they decided in 1994 to form the band System of a Down. Together, they recorded a demo titled "Untitled 1995 Demo" and "Demo Tape 1". In 1996, they recorded "Demo Tape 2" and "Demo Tape 3" and in 1997, recorded "Demo Tape 4". In 1997, after spending three years with System of a Down, Khachaturian had to leave the band due to an injury inflicted while practicing Jeet Kune Do after punching a hole in the wall and breaking every bone in his hand. He was replaced by John Dolmayan, the current drummer of System of a Down.

The Apex Theory, VoKee, KillMatriarch and DJ stage 
In 1998, Khachaturian, with Art Karamian, David Hakopyan and Sammy J. Watson, decided to form the band The Apex Theory, bringing to market two music albums and an EP.  In 2002, he left the band because of musical differences.
After leaving The Apex Theory, Khachaturian formed a rock band in 2004 with a group of friends, called VoKee. In 2010, he co-founded the industrial rock trio KillMatriarch and produced the first EP titled "Order Through Chaos". In 2012, the band disbanded and currently, Khachaturian is working in Los Angeles on his OnTronik solo project.

Bands

Discography

System of a Down 
Untitled 1995 Demo  (1995)
Demo Tape 1 (1995)
Demo Tape 2 (1996)
Demo Tape 3 (1997)
Demo Tape 4 (1997)

The Apex Theory 
Extendemo (EP) (2000)
The Apex Theory (EP) (2001)
Topsy-Turvy (2002)

KillMatriarch 
Order Through Chaos (EP) (2010)

References

External links 
 Khachaturian's official website (archived)
 

American heavy metal drummers
System of a Down members
American people of Armenian descent
American rock singers
Armenian rock musicians
Living people
1975 births
American DJs
20th-century American drummers
American male drummers
Nu metal singers
21st-century American singers
21st-century American drummers